Inga alley cropping is the planting agricultural crops between rows of Inga trees.  It has been promoted by Mike Hands.

Using the Inga tree for alley cropping has been proposed as an alternative to the much more ecologically destructive slash and burn cultivation. The technique has been found to increase yields. It is sustainable agriculture as it allows the same plot to be cultivated over and over again thus eliminating the need for burning of the rainforests to get fertile plots.

Inga tree

 
Inga trees are native to many parts of Central and South America. Inga grows well on the acid soils of the tropical rainforest and former rainforest. They are leguminous and fix nitrogen into a form usable by plants. Mycorrhiza growing within the roots (arbuscular mycorrhiza) was found to take up spare phosphorus, allowing it to be recycled into the soil.

Other benefits of Inga include the fact that it is fast growing with thick leaves which, when left on the ground after pruning, form a thick cover that protects both soil and roots from the sun and heavy rain. It branches out to form a thick canopy so as to cut off light from the weeds below and withstands careful pruning year after year.

History
The technique was first developed and trialled by tropical ecologist Mike Hands in Costa Rica in the late 1980s and early '90s. Research funding from the EEC allowed him to experiment with species of Inga. Although alley cropping had been widely researched, it was thought that the tough pinnate leaves of the Inga tree would not decompose quickly enough.

As the crops grow, so does the Inga.  When the crops are harvested the Inga is allowed to grow back.  Once more it closes the canopy, is pruned, and the cycle is repeated, time and again. Leaves pruned from the tree decompose on the ground releasing phosphorus for crops.  Fungi take up phosphorus to repeat the cycle.

Using this system, not only do the farmers grow their basic crops of maize and beans, but also cash crops.  Previously this was not possible because when the plot was a distance from the farmer's home, consistent guarding and tending could be too challenging. Now with the same plot being used continuously, it can be near home, thus allowing an entire family to  help to tend and guard it, even when there are young children.

The Inga is used as hedges and pruned when large enough to provide a mulch in which bean and corn seeds are planted. This results in both improving crop yields and the retention of soil fertility on the plot that is being farmed. Hands had seen the devastating consequences that are caused by slash and burn agriculture while working in Honduras; this new technique seemed to offer the solution to the environmental and economic problems faced by so many slash and burn farmers.

Although this technique has the potential to save rainforest and lift many out of poverty, Inga alley cropping has not yet reached its full potential, although the charity Inga Foundation, headed by Mike Hands, has been consulted about potential projects in Haiti ( which is almost completely deforested) and the Congo. Discussions have also been mooted about projects in Peru and Madagascar. Another charity, Rainforest Saver formed to promote Inga Alley Cropping, started a project in 2016 in Ecuador, in the area of the Amazon where Inga edulis originates from, and by the end of 2018 more than 60 farms in the area had Inga plots. Rainforest Saver also started a project in Cameroon in 2009, where in late 2018 there were around 100 farms with Inga plots, mainly in Western Cameroon.

Method

For Inga alley cropping the trees are planted in rows (hedges) close together, with a gap, the alley, of about 4m between the rows. An initial application of rock phosphate has kept the system going for many years.

When the trees have grown, usually in about two years, the canopies close over the alley and cut off the light and so smother the weeds.

The trees are then carefully pruned.  The larger branches are used for firewood. The smaller branches and leaves are left on the ground in the alleys. These rot down into a good mulch (compost). If any weeds haven't been killed off by lack of light the mulch smothers them.

The farmer then pokes holes into the mulch and plants their crops into the holes.

The crops grow, fed by the mulch. The crops feed on the lower layers while the latest prunings form a protective layer over the soil and roots, shielding them from both the hot sun and heavy rain.  This makes it possible for the roots of both the crops and the trees to stay to a considerable extent in the top layer of soil and the mulch, thus benefiting from the food in the mulch, and escaping soil pests and toxic minerals lower down. Pruning the Inga also makes its roots die back, thus reducing competition with the crops.

See also 

 Shifting cultivation

References 

T.D.Pennignton and E.C.M. Fernandes (editors) "The Genus Inga, Utilization"  Inga species and alley-cropping by Mike Hands, Kew Publications.

External links 
 Inga Foundation
 Rainforest Saver Foundation (Inga alley cropping projects in Honduras and Cameroon)
 Inga alley cropping as an agrometeorogical service to slash and burn cultivation
 What is inga alley cropping?

Environmental issues with forests
Tropical agriculture
Agroforestry